Bergün Filisur is a municipality in the Albula Region in the canton of Graubünden in Switzerland.  On 1 January 2018 the former municipalities of Bergün/Bravuogn and Filisur merged to form the new municipality of Bergün Filisur.

History

Bergün
Bergün/Bravuogn is first mentioned in 1209 as de Bregonio.

Filisur
Filisur is first mentioned in 1262 as villa Fallisour.

Geography
 

Population

Historic Population
The historical population is given in the following chart.  During construction of the Rhaetian Railway line the population of both communities increased significantly.

Weather
Filisur has an average of 107.7 days of precipitation per year and on average receives  of it. During this month there is precipitation for an average of 11.7 days.

Heritage sites of national significance
The municipal church and the Chasa Jenatsch with its barn in Bergün and the castle ruins of Greifenstein and the Schmittentobel-Landwasser Viaduct of the Rhaetian Railway in Filisur are listed as Swiss heritage sites of national significance.  The villages and hamlets of Bravuogn, Latsch, Stugl and Filisur are part of the Inventory of Swiss Heritage Sites.

The Albula Railway became a UNESCO World Heritage Site itself in 2008. It maintains the Bahnmuseum Albula at the Bergün train station. This railway museum documents the construction of the Albula line.  Both former municipalities contain track of the Albula Railway

Transportation

References

External links
 
 

 
Municipalities of Graubünden
Cultural property of national significance in Graubünden